There are eight properties listed on the National Register of Historic Places (NRHP) in Linn County, Kansas.

Two of the sites are the location of historic events. The Marais des Cygnes Massacre Site is the location of the Marais des Cygnes massacre, an 1858 event during Bleeding Kansas in which pro-slavery advocates kidnapped 11 anti-slavery settlers, killing five of them. John Brown temporarily used the site as a fort, and the property was listed on the NRHP in 1971.  The Battle of Mine Creek Site preserves the location of the Battle of Mine Creek, which was fought in 1864 as part of Price's Raid during the American Civil War.  Confederate general Sterling Price's army was retreating after being defeated at the Battle of Westport and was attacked by pursuing Union troops. Price's Confederate lost heavily in men and supplies.  The site was added to the NRHP in 1973.

Another two sites are bridges. The Landers Creek Bridge is a stone arch bridge built in 1917. It was listed on the NRHP in 1985. The Mine Creek Bridge was designed by James B. Marsh and constructed in 1927. Two historic schools in Prescott, Kansas, are also on the register. The Prescott School was built in 1882 and 1883 and was supplemented by the construction of the Prescott Rural High School in 1924. After the high school was built, the older building was only used as an elementary school. A school district consolidation occurred in 1972, and the high school students were sent to Mound City, Kansas, for education; the high school building was then used as the elementary school and the former elementary school became a library. In 2006, the elementary school was closed and became Prescott's city hall. The Prescott School was added to the NRHP in 1982 and the Prescott Rural High School in 2008.

The Linn County Courthouse entered use in 1887 and is the second-oldest operational courthouse in the state of Kansas.  The building was designed by George Ropes and was listed on the NRHP in 1974.  Land for the Old Linn County Jail was purchased in 1867, and the building was completed the next year; it was probably the first publicly-constructed building in Linn County.  After a new jail was built, the building was sold to the city of Mound City in 1903 for use as a city hall.  The building is still being used for governmental purposes.

Current listings

|}

See also

 List of National Historic Landmarks in Kansas
 National Register of Historic Places listings in Kansas

References

Linn
National Register of Historic Places in Linn County, Kansas
Buildings and structures in Linn County, Kansas